The 1914–15 Yale Bulldogs men's ice hockey season was the 20th season of play for the program.

Season
Before the season began Yale abandoned its plan to build an on-campus skating arena. They did so because the university was able to reach an agreement with the newly opened New Haven Arena and the Yale men's team possessed its first permanent home venue. They played their first game at the arena on December 16th against the New Haven Hockey Club, losing a disjointed game 1–4.

The team played twice over the winter break, with its full regular lineup, and broke even in the matches at the St. Nicholas Rink. When the Elis played their next home game the team had rounded into form and played a strong game against the Aggies, winning their first intercollegiate game of the year. Yale continued to beat up on the smaller colleges, winning twice more before heading to Canada for a match against Toronto. The Bulldogs played poorly in the first half, surrendering 3 goals to the Blues but recovered their game in the second. The team outplayed Toronto but couldn't overcome the sizable lead and returned to the States after a 2–3 loss.

Yale won one more game before their showdown against defending champion Princeton. The Tigers, however, were missing much of the previous year's offense and the Elis were able to hold Princeton to a single goal in a 3–1 win. A few days later the team was in Boston for a game against Harvard. The Crimson goaltender Wylie was the star of the game, turning aside many good shots for a 4–2 win over the Elis.

The Elis continued to burnish their record with wins over McGill and Dartmouth. They lost a close match to the St. Nicholas Hockey Club due to the incessant attack led by Hobey Baker. A few days later the team faced Baker's alma mater in a rematch. Despite their reduced offense, Princeton was able to restrict Yale to a single goal and captured the game in overtime, necessitating a third game three days later.

The rubber match was another tight checking battle with both defenses playing well. It was Yale's defense that held throughout the game, however, and the three goals from the Elis allowed them to win the game and capture the first series for the team since they had begun three years earlier. The rematch with Harvard happened just three days later and with the IHL series on the line the Elis had no margin for error. Yale played a tremendous game, outshooting Harvard 24 to 13, but the Harvard netminder was again the hero and Harvard skated away with the 3–1 win, along with a series victory and the Intercollegiate Championship.

Thomas Connors served as team manager.

Roster

Standings

Schedule and Results

|-
!colspan=12 style="color:white; background:#00356B" | Regular Season

References

Yale Bulldogs men's ice hockey seasons
Yale
Yale
Yale
Yale